Matt Roy may refer to:

 Matt Roy (bobsleigh) (fl. 1980s), American Olympic bobsledder 
 Matt Roy (ice hockey) (born 1995), American ice hockey player
 Mathieu Roy (ice hockey, born 1983), Canadian ice hockey player
 Mathieu Roy (ice hockey, born 1986), Canadian ice hockey player

See also
 Mat Roy Thompson (1874–1962), American civil engineer and architect